cgs or centimetre–gram–second is a system of physical units.

CGS may also refer to:
 Caistor Grammar School
 Canwest Global Communications Corp.'s TSX symbol
 CGS Aviation, an American manufacturer of ultralight aircraft
 C.G.S. colony, housing for government workers in Mumbai, India
 Canadian Government Ship, a ship prefix
 Center for Genetics and Society, US
 Central Geological Survey, Taiwan
 Championship Gaming Series, an international eSports league
 Chief of the General Staff, a senior army appointment in several countries
 China Geological Survey
 Council of Graduate Schools
 Crescent Girls' School
 CUSIP Global Services, the operating body of CUSIP

See also
CGS (schools) with initials CGS, some known by the initials